William Kirk House, also known as the Warrior Run Farm, is a historic home located at Delaware Township, Northumberland County, Pennsylvania.  It was built in 1828, and is a two-story, five bay, rectangular brick dwelling with a two-story rear ell.  It has a gable roof dated to about 1870, with a decorated cornice.  The interior has a center hall plan.  Also on the property is a contributing large barn with a gable roof and silo.

It was added to the National Register of Historic Places in 1980.

References

Houses on the National Register of Historic Places in Pennsylvania
Houses completed in 1828
Houses in Northumberland County, Pennsylvania
National Register of Historic Places in Northumberland County, Pennsylvania